San Luis is a city in Yuma County, Arizona, United States. The population was 25,505 at the 2010 census. It is part of the Yuma Metropolitan Statistical Area. San Luis, located in the southwest corner of the state directly adjacent to Mexico's Federal Highway 2 at San Luis Rio Colorado, was the second fastest-growing city or town in Arizona from 1990 to 2000. According to 2019 Census Bureau estimates, the population of the city is 34,778.

History
The city was established in 1930 with the opening of a border-crossing station. In the last twenty years it has registered an accelerated population increase, going from 1,946 inhabitants in 1980, to approximately 20,000 in the year 2005.

Geography
San Luis is located at  (32.496116, -114.768327). It stands on the U.S.-Mexico border, opposite San Luis Río Colorado, Sonora. The lowest point in Arizona is located on the Colorado River in San Luis, where it flows out of Arizona and into Sonora.

Economy
Retail trade, agriculture and manufacturing form a large portion of the local economy. Another significant segment is the light industry located on both sides of the U.S./Mexico border. San Luis is an excellent site for labor-intensive manufacturing and assembly plants.

San Luis is contiguous with the neighboring San Luis, Sonora. The  is the main transportation crossing between the two cities, connecting US Highway 95, Mexican Federal Highway 2, and Sonora State Highway 40.

Top employers
According to the City's 2014 Comprehensive Annual Financial Report, the top employers in San Luis are:

Scenic attractions
Visitor attractions within a 30-minute drive of San Luis include the old Territorial Prison, Fort Yuma and the 16th century Fort Thomas Mission. Laguna, Imperial and Morelos Dams and the California sand dunes are also nearby. Fishing, water skiing and swimming at lakes along the Colorado River attract residents of the area and tourists alike. Located across the border is San Luis, Sonora, Mexico, reputed to be Mexico's fastest-growing city with a population of approximately 200,000. This area has curio shops, night clubs and various other attractions for tourists.

Demographics

As of the census of 2000, there were 15,322 people, 6,525 households and 2,876 families residing in the city. The population density was 796.3 people per square mile. The racial makeup of the city was 63.2 White, 0.3% Black or African American, 1.5% Native American, 0.2% Asian, and 2.8% from two or more races. 98.7% of the population were Hispanic or Latino of any race.

There were 5,953 households, out of which 71.5% had children under the age of 18 living with them, 72.1% were married couples living together, 19.8% had a female householder with no husband present and 7.1% were non-families. 3.9% of all households were made up of individuals, and 5.7% had someone living alone who was 65 years of age or older. The average household size was 4.20 and the average family size was 4.33.

In the city, the population was spread out, with 35.6% under the age of 18, 12.9% from 18 to 24, 34.1% from 25 to 44, 13.4% from 45 to 64, and 4.0% who were 65 years of age or older. The median age was 26 years. For every 100 females, there were 126.5 males. For every 100 females age 18 and over, there were 144.6 males.

The median income for a household in the city was $30,637 and the median income for a family was $22,368. Males had a median income of $20,770 versus $14,149 for females. The per capita income for the city was $5,377. About 36.3% of families and 35.8% of the population were below the poverty line, including 38.5% of those under age 18 and 44.3% of those age 65 or over.

Prison
The Arizona State Prison Complex – Yuma is located on the corner of Avenue B and Juan Sanchez Boulevard, in San Luis. ASPC-Yuma provides housing to an average population of 2,279 convicted male felons. ASPC–Yuma is also a major employer in Yuma County, employing 755 full-time employees. Moreover, it is a provider of inmate work crews utilized by members of local, state and community organizations. Among other duties, ASPC-Yuma has a Wildland Fire Crew that consists of one sergeant, two correctional officers and twenty inmates that assists in fighting fires throughout Arizona.

San Luis Detention Facility was opened in 2007. The facility is owned by the San Luis Detention Facility Development Corporation, a subsidiary of the city, and is operated by LaSalle Corrections. The facility is located on the eastern edge of the city near the Arizona State Prison Complex. It has 464 beds to hold detainees, primarily for violations of immigration laws, from federal authorities. Approximately 80 full-time employees are employed by the facility.

Climate

Education
The city of San Luis is served by Gadsden Elementary School District #32, Yuma Union High School District #70, Harvest Preparatory Academy, PPEP TEC High Schools, Arizona Western College and Arizona State University. The elementary schools are: Gadsden Elementary, Rio Colorado Elementary, Arizona Desert Elementary, Ed Pastor Elementary, Cesar Chavez Elementary, and Desert View Elementary, San Luis Middle School and Southwest Jr. High.  All the Gadsden elementary schools are Performing Plus Schools as identified by the state of Arizona rating system. Only Gadsden Elementary School is at the performing level. San Luis High School, part of the Yuma Union High School District, serves over 2,000 high school students from the Gadsden Elementary District. Harvest Preparatory Academy is a new addition to San Luis, which opened its doors in August 2009.

Students in the 7th and 8th grades enroll in college courses through Arizona Western College with many students successfully completing college pre-calculus in the eighth grade. Gadsden students also attend various universities throughout the country during the summer in cooperation with Johns Hopkins University. In 2011, over 140 students qualified for university courses. In 2010, Gadsden students earned over $200,000 in college scholarships. In 2011, 21 students in 5th and 6th grades also qualified for summer university coursework. Gadsden Elementary School District serves over 5,000 pre-school through eighth students and is known for its marching band, jazz band and mariachi. The district has been recognized for 7th and 8th grade students taking the college level ACT college entrance examination. Arizona State University provides undergraduate and graduate education certification and degree program in partnership with Gadsden Elementary School District at Southwest Junior High.

Government

The city of San Luis uses a Council-Manager form of government, where the seven-member council appoints a city manager, city attorney, city engineer, city magistrate, chief of police and fire chief.

From 1996 to 2006, the city was in a plagued by a wave of recalls. The City had six different mayors in a 10-year period and went through almost two dozen council members during that time.

In January 2012, the city made national news when Alejandrina Cabrera, a city council candidate, was banned from running for office because it was claimed that she was not proficient enough in English. Yuma County Superior Judge John Nelson issued an order on January 25 stating that Cabrera's name be stricken from the ballot. Mayor Juan Carlos Escamilla had filed a lawsuit requesting that the court determine Cabrera's qualification to run for office based on her English skills. Cabrera had previously launched two unsuccessful recall campaigns against Escamilla, after the council raised utility rates. She claimed that the lawsuit was politically motivated. The issue was of national importance because it was reminiscent of Jim Crow Laws enacted in the southern United States between 1876 and 1965.

Media

Newspapers
Bajo el Sol is a major weekly newspaper in the town, published every Friday. The parent company of the Bajo el Sol, Freedom Publishers, Inc., also publishes The Yuma Sun, The Super Shopper and New Homes. The Yuma Sun is also a daily publication available in San Luis, as well as San Luis AZ News, a local weekly publication that has informed the community for over 20 years. Diario Noticias is a daily publication from San Luis Rio Colorado that covers news from around the region and is also available.

Television
San Luis is served by these bilingual Yuma area/ Imperial Valley American TV stations:
 KVFA-LP Channel 6 (Spanish language religious) - Indio.
 KVYE Channel 7 - (Univision) El Centro, subchannel LATV.
 KECY Channel 9 (FOX/ABC) - Yuma.
 KYMA-DT Channel 13 (NBC/CBS) - Yuma.
 KYUM-LD Channel 15 (Spanish language religious) - Yuma, Arizona.
 KYAZ-CA channel 16 (PBS) - transmitter of KOCE Indio now part of Los Angeles TV market area.
 KXYZ-CA channel 17 (Azteca America) - transmitter from Tucson.
 K19CX-D Channel 19 (PBS) (KAET) Phoenix, Arizona.
 KPAZ Channel 21 (TBN-religious) Wickenburg, Arizona.
 KESE-LD Channel 35 (Telemundo) - Yuma.
 KAJB Channels 36/54 (Telefutura) - El Centro.
 KPPX Channel 45 (ION) - Phoenix, Arizona, subchannels My Network and The CW.

Additionally by these Mexican TV Stations broadcast solely in Spanish:
 XHAQ Channels 1/5 (Azteca Uno) - Mexicali.
 XHBC Channels 3/4 (Televisa regional) - Mexicali.
 XHMEX Channels 5/32 (Televisa XHGC) - Mexicali.
 XHBM Channel 14 (Televisa XEW) - Mexicali.
 XHEXT Channel 20 (TV Azteca 7) - Mexicali.
 XHILA Channels 26/66 (CNI) - Mexicali.
 XHMEE Channel 38 (Televisa XEQ) - Mexicali.
 XHLRT Channel 44 (Televisa XHTV) - San Luis Rio Colorado.
 XHRCS Channel 50 (Telemax) - San Luis Rio Colorado.

Sports
San Luis has become the new home of an Arizona Winter League independent professional baseball franchise, the San Luis Atleticos, which began play in January 2009. The team represents not only their home city, but Mexico as well.

Transportation
San Luis is served by Yuma County Area Transit, which connects with Greyhound in Yuma.

U.S. Route 95 connects the city to Yuma, as does Arizona State Route 195. The San Luis Port of Entry and the San Luis II Port of Entry for trucks and commercial vehicles connect the town to San Luis Río Colorado, Sonora, Mexico.

Also several taxi companies operate within the city boundaries. Taxis are operated by individuals under company concession and under authority of the police department.

References

External links
 City of San Luis Official Page

 
Cities in Arizona
Cities in Yuma County, Arizona
Mexico–United States border crossings
Communities in the Lower Colorado River Valley
Lowest points of U.S. states
Populated places established in 1930